Chester John Darnton (October 13, 1918 – April 3, 2015) was an American football and basketball coach.  Darnton was the head football coach at Adrian College in Adrian, Michigan for one season, in 1950, compiling a record of 2–6.  He graduated from Adrian in 1943.  He was also the head basketball coach at Adrian for the 1950–51 season, tallying a mark of 5–17.

Head coaching record

Football

References

1918 births
2015 deaths
Adrian Bulldogs football coaches
Adrian Bulldogs men's basketball coaches
Adrian College alumni
People from Lenawee County, Michigan